Pranaav Jerry Chopra (born 6 September 1992) is an Indian badminton player. He joined the India national badminton team in 2007. In the year 2018, at the Commonwealth Games held in Gold Coast, Queensland, he won the gold medal in mixed team as being a member of the Indian mixed team. He is only the second player from India to reach Top 15 in the World Rankings in Mixed Doubles with his partner.

Childhood and early training 
Pranaav started training at the age of 7. He became the national champion twice in the boys doubles U-13 and U-19 events. At the U-19 level, he won a record nine titles in a year. If he is in the city, he used to train at Badminton Academy in the Shastri Hall, at Ludhiana. He lived in South City and later he joined Gopichand Badminton Academy, Hyderabad. He practiced eight hours and like to play doubles and mixed doubles instead of singles matches. He was coached by Pullela Gopichand.
Pranaav has won medals in several national ranking tournaments. In the Youth Commonwealth Games, Pune, he won a bronze medal, at Fajr Senior International Challenge Cup in Tehran, Iran he won a gold medal and at Tata International Challenge in Mumbai he ended up winning a gold medal and in Bern, Switzerland at The Swiss International Challenge he won a silver medal.

Career

2007 
In 2007, Pranaav made his international debut in the Milo Junior Tournament held in Bandang, Thailand.

2008 
In 2008, Balewadi Sports Complex, Pune, Pranaav won the bronze medal at the Commonwealth Youth Games in the boys' doubles event partnered with B. Sai Praneeth.

2010 
In 2010, Pranaav became the national champion in the mixed doubles event in the National Games.

2011 
In 2011, Bern, Switzerland, Swiss International Challenge Pranaav won a silver medal in men's doubles event.

2013 
In 2013, Pranaav became the national champion in men's doubles event in the National Games.

2014 
Pranaav competed at the 2014 Asian Games and in the 2014 Commonwealth Games, in the mixed team bronze medal match, Indian mixed team went down to the Singapore mixed team by a score of 2-3 and eventually Indian mixed team lost the bronze medal.

2016 
In 2016, Pranaav won two Grand Prix titles with his mixed doubles partner N. Sikki Reddy in the form of Brasil Open and Russian Open. Later in the same year, he married his playing companion and an Indian badminton player, Pradnya Gadre.

2018 
In the Commonwealth Games held in Gold Coast, Queensland, Pranaav paired with his mixed doubles partner, Gadde Ruthvika Shivani defeated Sri Lankan mixed doubles team led by Sachin Dias and Thilini Pramodika Hendahewa by 21-15, 19-21, 22-20 and gave Indian mixed team a lead for the run for the gold medal. Lastly, Indian mixed team defeated Sri Lanka's mixed team by 5-0 in all the five matches and thus Pranaav won the gold medal in mixed team as being a member of the Indian mixed team.

Achievements

South Asian Games 
Men's doubles

Mixed doubles

Asian Junior Championships 
Mixed doubles

BWF World Tour (1 runner-up)
The BWF World Tour, announced on 19 March 2017 and implemented in 2018, is a series of elite badminton tournaments, sanctioned by Badminton World Federation (BWF). The BWF World Tour are divided into six levels, namely World Tour Finals, Super 1000, Super 750, Super 500, Super 300 (part of the HSBC World Tour), and the BWF Tour Super 100.

Mixed doubles

BWF Grand Prix (3 titles, 2 runners-up) 
The BWF Grand Prix has two levels, the BWF Grand Prix and Grand Prix Gold. It is a series of badminton tournaments sanctioned by the Badminton World Federation (BWF) since 2007.

Men's doubles

Mixed doubles

  BWF Grand Prix Gold tournament
  BWF Grand Prix tournament

BWF International Challenge/Series (3 titles, 2 runners-up) 
Men's doubles

  BWF International Challenge tournament
  BWF International Series tournament

References

External links 
 
 

Living people
1992 births
Racket sportspeople from Punjab, India
Indian male badminton players
Badminton players at the 2014 Commonwealth Games
Badminton players at the 2018 Commonwealth Games
Commonwealth Games gold medallists for India
Commonwealth Games medallists in badminton
Badminton players at the 2014 Asian Games
Badminton players at the 2018 Asian Games
Asian Games competitors for India
South Asian Games gold medalists for India
South Asian Games silver medalists for India
South Asian Games medalists in badminton
21st-century Indian people
Medallists at the 2018 Commonwealth Games